Wang Hao-te (1921–1999) was the founder of the Great Way of Maitreya, which is based in Hsinchu, Taiwan. According to a survey done in 2004, this religion has 1,000,000 members and 2,000 temples all over the world. Wang was born in 1921, the 28th day of the 7th lunar month (August 31, 1921) in a small village called Zhang Gu in Shandong province, China.  He went to Taiwan when he was 17 years old during the Second World War, and he was introduced to Yiguandao in 1948 by chance.  He was a hardworking, well loved and down-to-earth talented young man and he was the only person appointed to take care of Sun Su Zhen, or "Shi Mu" 師母, the great mistress of Yiguandao, for 11 years until her death on 4 April 1975.

In 1987, Wang set up the Providence Maitreya Buddha Institute in Hsinchu, Taiwan. Wang died of CO2 poisoning on Christmas Day in 1999 during his mission to Chiang Mai, Thailand.

See also
Yiguandao
Zhang Tian Ran
Sun Su Zhen

Sources
Clart, Philip. 2000. Opening the Wilderness for the Way of Heaven: A Chinese New Religion in the Greater Vancouver Area. Journal of Chinese Religions 28: 127-144
Soo, Khin Wah. 1997. A Study of the Yiguan Dao (Unity Sect) and its Development in Peninsular Malaysia. Ph.D. dissertation, University of British Columbia.
台灣地區宗教簡介: 彌勒大道 Introduction to religions in the Taiwan territory: Maitreya Great Tao, Department of Civil Affairs, Ministry of Interior, Republic of China. 2001. Accessed February 7, 2006.

External links
 Maitreya Great Tao website
 The Life of Wang Hao Te according to his follower

1921 births
1999 deaths
Chinese religious leaders
Founders of new religious movements
People from Shandong
Yiguandao